1800 in sports describes the year's events in world sport.

Boxing
Events
 7 January — Jack Bartholomew retained his English Championship title after drawing with Jem Belcher at St George's Fields in a contest lasting 51 rounds.
 15 May — Belcher, known as the "Napoleon of the Ring", defeated Bartholomew in 17 rounds on Finchley Common to claim the Championship of England. He held the title until 1805.

Cricket
Events
 Robert Robinson is believed to have been the first batsman to try to introduce leg guards but the experiment was unsuccessful.
England
 Most runs – William Barton 226 (HS 51)
 Most wickets – John Ward 47 (BB 7–?)

Horse racing
England
 The Derby – Champion
 The Oaks – Ephemera
 St Leger Stakes – Champion

References

 
Sports by year